AV-TEST is an independent organization which evaluates and rates antivirus and security suite software for Microsoft Windows, MacOS and Android operating systems, according to a variety of criteria. The organisation is based in Magdeburg, Germany.

Every other month, the researchers publish the results of their testing, where they list which products they awarded their certification. They regularly test antivirus, anti-spyware and firewall software for the software publishers and for magazines. In the field of product certification they work together with Tekit Consult Bonn GmbH (TÜV Saarland group).

The tests are performed on desktop computers and servers running Windows 98, ME, NT 4, 2000, XP, 2003; Novell NetWare, Linux, Solaris, FreeBSD, OpenBSD, Lotus Domino/Notes and Microsoft Exchange.

History 
It was founded by Andreas Marx (CEO) and Guido Habicht.

Criticism 
In 2013, the security specialist and CEO of IT security company Kaspersky Lab, Eugene Kaspersky, criticized AV-TEST for changing their certification process.

See also
 AV-Comparatives

References

External links
 

Antivirus software
Information technology companies of Germany